Conrado Masonsong Estrella III (born September 12, 1960) is a Filipino politician serving as the Secretary of Agrarian Reform since June 30, 2022. He was previously one of the deputy speakers of the 18th Congress under the leadership of Speaker Alan Peter Cayetano and Lord Allan Velasco.

Early life 
Estrella was born on September 12, 1960 in Manila to former Congressman Robert B. Estrella Sr. and Ma. Teresita Masonsong-Estrella. He is the grandson of Conrado Estrella Sr., a former governor of Pangasinan and Secretary/Minister of Agrarian Reform during the Marcos Sr. administration.

Education 
He graduated from De La Salle University with a degree in history and political science.

Political career 
His early political career began in the Kabataang Barangay (KB) where he became the president of the provincial KB federation of Pangasinan, chairman of the regional KB federation of Ilocos Region, and member of the KB National Council. From 1980 to 1985, he was a member of the Pangasinan Provincial Board.

Estrella was elected to the House of Representatives of the Philippines in 1987 and 1992, representing Pangasinan's 6th congressional district. In the 8th Congress, he ran under the Kilusang Bagong Lipunan, was one of the youngest elected representative at age 26 and was a member of the opposition. It was reported that his first campaign was funded by Ferdinand Marcos. In the 9th Congress, he was the vice-chairman of the House Committees on Accounts and Tourism. In 1994, he was offered by then-President Fidel V. Ramos to head the Philippine Sports Commission in an attempt to block his reelection bid where he would run against Ranjit Shahani, Ramos' nephew and son of then-Senator Leticia Ramos-Shahani. The sports community, however, did not approve of the plan prompting Ramos to appoint Philip Juico instead. Estrella ultimately withdrew from the race and was later appointed to the Manila Economic and Cultural Office where he served as one of its directors from 1995 to 1998. During the Estrada presidency, he became the administrator of the National Electrification Administration.

Estrella returned to the House of Representatives as the representative of the 6th district of Pangasinan in 2001 and served until 2010. During the 12th Congress, he was the chairman of the House Special Committee on the North Luzon Growth Quadrangle. In 2013, he became the party-list representative of Abono succeeding his brother Robert Raymond Estrella. He was among the 23 representatives linked to the pork barrel scam by a Philippine Daily Inquirer exposé in 2013. The National Bureau of Investigation subsequently named Estrella and his brother in its 2015 report to the Ombudsman among those allegedly involved in malversation, direct bribery, and other graft and corrupt practices. That same year, he was served numerous notices of disallowances from the Commission on Audit with regards to the use of his Priority Development Assistance Fund to implement livelihood projects worth ₱64million in Pangasinan coursed through questionable non-governmental organizations. He was later excluded from liability by the commission in 2018 due to a court decision which declared his signatures in the documents facilitating the transactions to be forgeries.

On July 10, 2020, he was one of the 70 representatives who voted to reject the franchise renewal of ABS-CBN. And on June 8, 2022, he accepted the offer of President Bongbong Marcos to head the Department of Agrarian Reform as its secretary after his grandfather, Conrado Estrella Sr. who also became secretary from 1971 to 1986.

Personal life 
Estrella married Sandra S. Romero on June 7, 1985 at the age of 24. The couple produced four children: Maria Sergia Susana, Conrado Andrew IV, Albert and Gilbert.

References

External links

1960 births
Deputy Speakers of the House of Representatives of the Philippines
People from Pangasinan
Members of the House of Representatives of the Philippines from Pangasinan
Party-list members of the House of Representatives of the Philippines
Living people
Secretaries of Agrarian Reform of the Philippines
Bongbong Marcos administration cabinet members
Estrada administration personnel